Sam Galip Jacobs (born March 4, 1938) is an American prelate of the Roman Catholic Church, serving as bishop of the Diocese of Houma-Thibodaux in Louisiana from 2003 to 2013.  He previously served as bishop of the Diocese of Alexandria in Louisiana from 1989 to 2003.

Biography

Early years 
Sam Jacobs was born on March 4, 1938, in Greenwood, Mississippi, but raised in Lake Charles, Louisiana. In 1951, he entered Immaculata Seminary in Lafayette, Louisiana, graduating in 1957.  Jacobs then entered the Catholic University of America in Washington, D.C., as a Basselin scholar  graduating with a degree in theology in 1964.

After graduation from college, Jacobs served as chairman of the National Service Committee for the Charismatic Renewal and diocesan director of vocations and seminarians for the Diocese of Lake Charles.

Priesthood 
On June 6, 1964, Jacobs was ordained to the priesthood for the Diocese of Lafayette by Bishop Warren L. Boudreaux. Jacobs served as pastor, chaplain, and associate pastor of several parishes in the Diocese of Lafayette and the Diocese of Lake Charles.

Bishop of Alexandria 
On July 1, 1989, Pope John Paul II appointed Jacobs as the tenth bishop of the Diocese of Alexandria. He received his episcopal consecration on August 24 at the Rapides Parish Coliseum in Alexandria, Louisiana, from Archbishop Francis Schulte, with Bishops Boudreaux and Jude Speyrer serving as co-consecrators.

After becoming bishop, Jacobs held town meeting in every parish in the diocese to meet parishioners and hear their concerns.  Under Jacobs, the diocese inaugurated the Steubenville South Youth Conference and constructed a new youth center at the Maryhill Renewal Center in Alexandria, to accommodate youth retreats.

A 2002 article by the Dallas Morning News revealed that in 1998 Jacobs received an allegation of fondling against John Andries, a parish priest in Natchitoches Parish.  Jacobs suspended Andries and removed him from his parish. However, after Andries received counseling and testing, Jacobs returned him to the same parish. Jacobs did not notify authorities about the accusation. In 2002, Andries was charged with touching and masturbating onto a sleeping boy at the family's house in Abbeville, Louisiana.  The boy's family sued Jacobs and the diocese

Bishop of Houma-Thibodaux 
On August 1, 2003, John Paul II appointed Jacobs as the third bishop of the Diocese of Houma-Thibodaux.  He was installed on October 10, 2003. Within the United States Conference of Catholic Bishops, he served chairman of the Committee for Evangelization (2005-2007), and was a member of the Committee on Laity, Marriage, Family Life and Youth and the Committee on Evangelization and Catechesis.

On September 23, 2013, Pope Francis accepted Jacobs's letter of resignation and appointed Auxiliary Bishop Shelton Fabre as the new bishop of the Diocese of Houma-Thibodaux.

See also
 

 Catholic Church hierarchy
 Catholic Church in the United States
 Historical list of the Catholic bishops of the United States
 List of Catholic bishops of the United States
 Lists of patriarchs, archbishops, and bishops

References

External links 
 Roman Catholic Diocese of Houma–Thibodaux Official Site
 Committee for Evangelization
 Committee on Laity, Marriage, Family Life and Youth
 Committee on Evangelization and Catechesis

Episcopal succession

1938 births
Roman Catholic bishops of Alexandria
Living people
Catholic University of America alumni
20th-century Roman Catholic bishops in the United States
21st-century Roman Catholic bishops in the United States
Religious leaders from Mississippi